Amir Damar Koku  (born 8 December 1979) is a Sudanese footballer who plays central defender.

International career
Koku played for the Sudan for the 2008 African Cup of Nations and World Cup qualifications 2010.

References

External links

Sudanese footballers
Sudan international footballers
2008 Africa Cup of Nations players
1979 births
Living people
Al-Merrikh SC players
Association football central defenders